On 30 October 2022, a petrol bomb attack was perpetrated against a Border Force centre for processing migrants in Dover, Kent, England. Two people suffered minor injuries.

After the attack, the suspect, a 66-year-old man from High Wycombe, Buckinghamshire, drove to a nearby petrol station where he killed himself.

Attack

Around 11:20 GMT on 30 October 2022, a man drove a white Seat Tarraco to the Border Force centre in Dover, Kent, and threw two or three petrol bombs at the complex. One of the bombs failed to ignite. A witness stated that the attacker then drove to a petrol station and tied a noose around his neck and attached it to a metal pole before driving off, killing himself.

Investigation 
Kent Police said that two or three devices had been thrown into a Home Office establishment and that investigations were ongoing. They were unable to confirm that the attacker had killed himself.

An army bomb disposal unit was sent to the site of the attack and to the petrol station on Limekiln Road to examine a suspect vehicle, where another device was found and later made safe by the Explosive Ordnance Disposal Unit.

Police said it was likely a hate attack, driven by a right-wing ideology, and was being investigated by counter-terrorism police.

Suspect
Police said that the suspect was a 66-year-old man from High Wycombe in Buckinghamshire. A property in High Wycombe was searched by Thames Valley Police the day after the attack.

The suspect had posted rants on Facebook against Muslims, asylum seekers, China, and COVID-19. The suspect was found dead shortly after the attack. Counter-terrorism teams have been brought in to investigate him.

On 5 November 2022 Counter Terrorism Police South East announced that it had "recovered evidence that indicates the attack at an immigration centre in Dover on Sunday, 30 October 2022, was motivated by a terrorist ideology" and "there was an extreme right-wing motivation behind the attack".

Motive
Counter Terrorism Policing senior national coordinator Tim Jaques said that while there were "strong indications that mental health was likely a factor" he concluded that the "suspect’s actions were primarily driven by an extremist ideology" and these met the "threshold for a terrorist incident".

The suspect was unknown to counter terrorist police and there were no indications he had worked with anyone else.

References

2022 in England
2020s in Kent
Arson in England
Arson in the 2020s
Attacks in the United Kingdom in 2022
Attacks on buildings and structures in 2022
Building bombings in England
Crime in Kent
Firebomb attack
October 2022 crimes in Europe
October 2022 events in the United Kingdom
United Kingdom border control
Terrorist incidents in England
Terrorist incidents in the United Kingdom in 2022
Right-wing terrorist incidents